Pool equipment may refer to:

 Cue sports equipment, sporting goods used for playing pool (pocket billiards)
 Sanitation and other general equipment for swimming pools
 Water sports equipment used in swimming pools and natural bodies of water